Beijing Enterprises Clean Energy Group Ltd is a Hong Kong-based company with interests in renewable energy and related industries. It was established in 2000 as Jin Cai Holdings Co., was incorporated in the Cayman Islands then listed on the Hong Kong stock exchange. The company was incorporated in November 2012, appeared in the  Paradise Papers leak in 2014 and changed its name to Beijing Enterprises Clean Energy Group in 2015.

Projects 
In December 2018, it was announced that the company intends to develop a AUD$145 million facility in Whyalla, South Australia incorporating PV solar energy generation and intensive horticulture. According to the Whyalla City Council, the company's projects elsewhere include solar farms, wind farms, battery storage systems, clean heating supply services, geothermal power systems, and micro-grid network technologies.

Ownership 
BECE's majority shareholder is Beijing Enterprises Water Group Limited. Along with its subsidiaries, the company provides water services in mainland China, Singapore, Malaysia and Portugal. The company has two main segments: Sewage and Reclaimed Water Treatment and Construction Services, and Water Distribution Services. The former constructs and operates sewage and reclaimed water treatment plants, constructs seawater desalination plants and supports related projects with construction services. The latter distributes and sells piped water.

The company was incorporated in Hong Kong and has its headquarters in Wan Chai. Prior to 2008, the company was named Shang Hua Holdings Ltd. It was incorporated in 1992.

As of 2016, the company's CEO and Executive Director is Mr Min Zhou and Mr Li Li is COO, EVP and Executive Director.

References 

Renewable energy in Hong Kong